Hildegard "Hilde" Schrader (4 January 1910 – 23 March 1966) was a German swimmer who won the 200 m breaststroke event at the 1928 Summer Olympics and 1927 European Championships. She also set two world records in obsolete breaststroke events, one in the 400 m (1928) and one in the 200 yd (1929). In 1994 she was inducted to the International Swimming Hall of Fame.

See also
 List of members of the International Swimming Hall of Fame

References

1910 births
1966 deaths
People from Staßfurt
German female swimmers
German female breaststroke swimmers
Olympic swimmers of Germany
Swimmers at the 1928 Summer Olympics
Olympic gold medalists for Germany
European Aquatics Championships medalists in swimming
Medalists at the 1928 Summer Olympics
Olympic gold medalists in swimming
Sportspeople from Saxony-Anhalt
20th-century German women